HKCC may refer to:
A Windows Registry key
 Hong Kong Cricket Club
 Hong Kong Cultural Centre
 Hong Kong Community College